Anomoeotes infuscata is a species of moth of the Anomoeotidae family. It is known from Angola.

References

Endemic fauna of Angola
Anomoeotidae
Moths of Africa
Moths described in 1929